Rajkumar is an Indian politician from Uttarakhand. He was a member of Indian National Congress until 2021. He resigned from his seat in Purola assembly constituency and joined Bharatiya Janata Party in September 2021.

Career 
He became the representative for Rajpur (Uttarakhand Assembly constituency) following the 2012 Uttarakhand Legislative Assembly election, remaining until 2017 when he lost to Khajan Das of the Bharatiya Janata Party.

References

Living people
Indian National Congress politicians from Uttarakhand
Year of birth missing (living people)
Uttarakhand MLAs 2022–2027